This list of botanical gardens and arboretums in Guam is intended to include all significant botanical gardens and arboretums in the United States territory Guam

See also
List of botanical gardens and arboretums in the United States

References 

 
Guam
Botanical gardens and arboretums in Guam